Woutersia was a Triassic genus of 'symmetrodont' and the only representative of the family Woutersiidae. It was originally classified as a kuehneotheriid, but it has been suggested that it may be related to Docodonta. Remains of W. mirabilis and W. butleri have been found in the Gres à Avicula contorta Formation at Saint-Nicolas-de-Port, France, while W. mirabilis has been found in Varangéville, France; remains have been dated to the Late Triassic, 205.6 to 201.6 Ma.

References

Prehistoric mammaliaforms
Prehistoric cynodont genera
Rhaetian life
Late Triassic synapsids of Europe
Triassic France
Fossils of France
Fossil taxa described in 1983
Taxa named by Denise Sigogneau‐Russell